The article contains information about the 2018–19 Iran 3rd Division football season. This is the 4th rated football league in Iran after the Persian Gulf Cup, Azadegan League, and 2nd Division. The league started from October 2018.

In total and in the first round, 65 teams will compete in 5 different groups.

First round
Each team who give up in 2 matches, will be relegated 2 divisions for next season. Therefore, in this stage, the teams which give up 2 matches, will be eligible to play in the provincial 2nd division for 2019-20 season (and not eligible to play in the provincial 1st division)

Group A

Group B

Group C

Group D

Group E

Second round

Second Round will be started after first round (December 2018)

Promotion and Relegation:

Teams rankes first and second in each group (Total 6 teams) will promote to 2nd Division.

Teams ranked 9th and 10th in each group and the 2 worst 8th ranked teams (Total 8 teams) will be relegated to 1st round of 3rd Dicivion.

Each team who give up in 2 matches, will be relegated 2 divisions for next season. Therefore, in this stage, the teams which gave up 2 matches, will be eligible to play in the provincial 1st division for 2019-20 season (and not eligible to play in the 1st stage of 3rd division as a lower Division)

Group 1

Group 2

Group 3

References 

League 3 (Iran) seasons
4